Lee Tucker may refer to:
 Lee Tucker (footballer, born 1971), English football player for Middlesbrough and Darlington
 Lee Tucker (footballer, born 1978), English football player for Torquay